The Morton Freeman Plant Hunting Lodge is the centerpiece of a hunting retreat at 56 Stone Ranch Road in East Lyme, Connecticut. It is a large two-story Bungalow style house, designed by Dudley St. Clair Donnelly and built in 1908 by financier Morton Freeman Plant, and is one of the only early 20th-century purpose-built hunting lodges in the state. It was the heart of a large  private game preserve that Plant stocked with game birds. The property was listed on the National Register of Historic Places on December 12, 1988.

Description and history
The Morton Freeman Plant Hunting Lodge is located in an isolated rural setting in western East Lyme.  The lodge stands on 105 acres of land, nearly completely surrounded by town conservation land and a state National Guard training center, all land that was once historically associated with the lodge.  There are two buildings on the lodge grounds, which are entirely wooded except for the clearing in which they stand, and Stone Ranch Road, which provides access.  The lodge is a 1-1/2 story frame structure with a broad hip roof that creates an overhanging porch in the front, supported by stone piers.  Dormers pierce three of the roof faces, and a single-story service ell extends to the rear of the main block.  The interior of the building retains original finishes, including two concrete fireplaces built to resemble those found in 16th-century European manor houses.

Morton Freeman Plant's father, Henry Plant, made the family fortune by developing railroads in Florida.  He took over his father's business in 1899.  Born and raised in southeastern Connecticut, Plant began purchasing land in East Lyme and Lyme as a hunting retreat in 1907, which grew to about 2400 acres by 1914.  The lodge was built in 1908 to a design by Dudley St. Clair Donnelly, a regionally prominent architect who executed a number of commissions for Plant.  Plant died in the 1918 influenza pandemic, and the property was broken up by his heirs.

See also
National Register of Historic Places listings in New London County, Connecticut

References

National Register of Historic Places in New London County, Connecticut
Buildings and structures completed in 1908
East Lyme, Connecticut
Buildings and structures in New London County, Connecticut
1908 establishments in Connecticut